The Truth About Emanuel (previously Emanuel and the Truth About Fishes) is a 2013 American thriller drama film written, directed and produced by Francesca Gregorini. The film stars Jessica Biel, Kaya Scodelario, Alfred Molina, Jimmi Simpson, Aneurin Barnard and Frances O'Connor. It premiered at the Sundance Film Festival on January 18, 2013.

Plot
Emanuel is a seventeen-year-old girl still wracked with guilt over her mother who died giving birth to her. She meets Claude, whom she becomes romantically involved with. Emanuel lives at her home in Los Angeles with her father and her stepmother, with whom she has issues.

A woman named Linda moves next door, who looks just like Emanuel's mother. Emanuel discovers that Linda needs a babysitter. Emanuel agrees in order to get to know more about Linda. Emanuel discovers that "baby Chloe" is actually a doll. As Linda and Emanuel develop a friendship, Emanuel tries to hide the fact that Linda's "child" is really a doll from others. This becomes harder when her best friend, Arthur agrees to babysit because Linda will be attending Emanuel's birthday dinner.

At dinner, while in the kitchen Emanuel's stepmother Janice tells Linda that Emanuel is troubled and might be misinterpreting Linda's fondness for her. When saying goodnight to Claude, Emanuel treats him harshly because he's agreed to landscape for Linda. Emanuel thinks that he's following her. He has been to her home multiple times, and now he would be at Linda's. Claude tells Emanuel that she won't have to see him anymore and leaves.

Emanuel babysits when Linda goes out with Arthur. When they return home, Linda suggests Arthur go upstairs with her to see the baby, who Emanuel says is sleeping. Emanuel begs Arthur not to go upstairs but after Linda calls him up again he heads upstairs and realizes the baby is not real. Linda realizes that Chloe is a doll and panics about where her baby is, thinking that Emanuel replaced Linda's baby with a doll. They call Emanuel and ask her where Chloe is. She tells them Chloe is in her crib, and Arthur shows her that it is a doll, demanding to know where Linda's baby is. Emanuel begins to have a meltdown and takes the doll and faints. She has a vision in which she holds onto Chloe while water floods the room.

Emanuel swims out of a window into a body of water, holding the doll and sees her dead mother swimming. The doll springs to life and swims to Emanuel's mother, who embraces the baby and swims away. Emanuel hears her name being called and swims away until she awakens on a gurney with her father and a police officer present. She is taken to the hospital. When asked about the baby's disappearance, she claims the baby got away in the water and went to Emanuel's mom and they both swam away. Once out of the hospital, Emanuel visits Claude at his job and makes up with him.

Linda's husband is found, and he explains to Emanuel and her parents that after much difficulty, they finally had a baby who died, with the autopsy results being inconclusive. Linda blamed herself. Linda began using a doll as a replacement. When her husband tried to have her institutionalized, she disappeared. Linda is currently being held in a psychiatric hospital. Emanuel later asks her father for permission to go see Linda but he tells her no.

Emanuel breaks into Linda's house and steals the doll. With Claude's help, she sneaks into the psychiatric hospital and goes to Linda's room, telling her that her baby drowned. Emanuel describes her vision omitting the part about her mom. Emanuel sneaks Linda out of the hospital and brings her to the cemetery where Emanuel's mother is buried. Emanuel digs a grave over her mother's tomb and buries Chloe in it. The movie ends with the two women lying in the dirt, watching the stars in the night sky.

Cast 
 Kaya Scodelario as Emanuel
 Jessica Biel as Linda
 Alfred Molina as Dennis
 Frances O'Connor as Janice
 Jimmi Simpson as Arthur
 Aneurin Barnard as Claude
 Sam Jaeger as Thomas
 Spencer Garrett as Officer Ted

Production

Development
Rooney Mara was set to play the title character, Emanuel, before Kaya Scodelario replaced her as the lead.

Filming
Filming took place in Los Angeles, California, between 23 January 2012 and 26 February 2012.

Release
The Truth About Emanuel premiered at the 2013 Sundance Film Festival on January 18, 2013. The film was also shown at the Ashland Independent Film Festival in April 2013, in November at the Denver Film Festival, and in several other film festivals in US, UK and Brazil.
The film was released in US theaters on January 10, 2014, and will be available on Blu-ray and DVD on March 25, 2014.

Reception
The Truth About Emanuel received mostly negative reviews. The review aggregator website Rotten Tomatoes reports that 37% of critics gave the film a positive review, based on 30 reviews.

Jeannette Catsoulis of The New York Times wrote that the film "uses overwrought scenes of magical realism to couch psychosis as poetry and masochism as growing pains. Dependent on the cliché of women operating solely on instinct and without regard for logic (or, apparently, gainful employment), the film never finds its dramatic footing. Nor, sadly, its common sense." Kyle Smith of The New York Post panned the film, giving it 1 star out of 4, writing that it deserved a parody remake for the dream sequences in which Emanuel is underwater: "Worse than the contrivances, though, are the many pretentious dream sequences of Emanuel swimming deep underwater, hoping to reconnect with her mom, or something. Unlike the title character, though, the script by director Francesca Gregorini sinks to the bottom of the ocean with its cement-like touch."

Christy Lemire of RogerEbert.com rated the film 1.5 stars out of 4. She praised Kaya Scodelario's presence, but criticized the overall tone of the film. "The elaborate tap dance of protection and distraction plays like farce when it should be gripping and tense, and it's unintentionally amusing when it should be creepy or sad."

Awards
Writer, director and producer Francesca Gregorini earned a nomination at the Sundance Film Festival for 2013 Grand Jury Prize – Dramatic.

Francesca Gregorini also earned the Best Feature Director prize at the 2013 L.A. Femme Film Festival.

The film earned awards at the 2013 Ashland Independent Film Festival and 2013 Brooklyn Film Festival.

Lawsuit
In January 2020, writer/director Francesca Gregorini filed a copyright infringement and injunction-seeking lawsuit against Apple TV+ and the creators and producers of Servant, a psychological horror series that debuted on the new streaming network in November 2019. She alleged that Servant "is a brazen copy" of  The Truth About Emanuel and accused them of sexism. Servants creator Tony Basgallop and co-producer M. Night Shyamalan responded that neither had seen her film and that any similarity is coincidence.

On May 28, 2020, a federal judge threw out the copyright lawsuit against M. Night Shyamalan and Apple, ruling that the TV show is not similar enough to the film to merit a lawsuit.

On July 21, 2020, the court ordered Francesca Gregorini to pay the defendants' attorneys' fees of $162,467.30. The court emphasized the objective unreasonableness of her claims and derided her attempt to twist two highly dissimilar works into similarity.

References

External links

 
 The Truth About Emanuel at Swikat

2013 films
2013 independent films
2013 thriller drama films
American independent films
American thriller drama films
Films about psychiatry
Films shot in Los Angeles
2013 drama films
2010s English-language films
2010s American films